Spring Run is an unincorporated community in Fannett Township in Franklin County, Pennsylvania, United States. Spring Run is located at the intersection of state routes 75 and 641, west of Roxbury.

References

Unincorporated communities in Franklin County, Pennsylvania
Unincorporated communities in Pennsylvania